Nina Felshin (born 1944) is an American curator, writer, art historian and activist. She edited But Is It Art? The Spirit of Art as Activism and has authored many articles and essays on art. Felshin is an independent curator and was a curator at Wesleyan University's Ezra and Cecile Zilkha Gallery in Middletown, Connecticut, The Contemporary Arts Center in Cincinnati, Ohio and The Corcoran Gallery of Art in Washington, D.C. While at Wesleyan, she co-taught a cross-discipline course on Issues in Contemporary Art.

Partial list of curatorial projects 
Global Warning: Artists and Climate Change, 2009, Zilkha Gallery, Wesleyan University.
Framing and Being Framed: The Uses of Documentary Photography, 2008, Zilkha Gallery, Wesleyan University.
Disasters of War: From Goya to Golub, 2005, Zilkha Gallery, Wesleyan University.
Black and Blue: Examining Police Violence, 2000–01, Zilkha Gallery, Wesleyan University.
Embedded Metaphor, 1996–99.
Empty Dress: Clothing as Surrogate in Recent Art, 1993–95.
No Laughing Matter, 1991–93, Catalog
The State of Upstate: New York Women Artists, 1990, curated by art historian Nina Felshin with the support of the National Museum of Women in the Arts. Jody Lafond
The Presence of Absence: New Installations, 1989–93.
Verbally Charged Images, 1984–86.

See also 
Classificatory disputes about art
List of Independent Curators International exhibitions
Protest art

References

External links 
 Nina Felshin @ International Curators International
 Interview on Eldridge & Co. on CUNY TV

1944 births
Living people
American art curators
Feminist historians
Women art historians
American art historians
American women historians
21st-century American women
American women curators